Peter Howard Costello  (born 14 August 1957) is an Australian businessman, lawyer and former politician who served as the treasurer of Australia in government of John Howard from 1996 to 2007. He is the longest-serving treasurer in Australia's history. Costello was a member of parliament (MP) of the Australian House of Representatives from 1990 to 2009, representing the Division of Higgins. He also served as the Deputy Leader of the Liberal Party from 1994 to 2007.

On 18 September 2008, Costello was appointed as chairman of the World Bank's new Independent Advisory Board (IAB) to provide advice on anti-corruption measures. Costello has served as Chairman of Nine Entertainment Co. since February 2016. Costello is Chairman of the Board of Guardians of Australian Future Fund.

Early life
Costello was born on 14 August 1957 in Melbourne into a middle-class family of practising Christians. He was the second of three children; his elder brother, Tim, is a prominent Baptist minister and former CEO of World Vision Australia. Costello was educated at Carey Baptist Grammar School and Monash University, where he studied arts and law, graduating with honours in 1982. Costello is a descendant of Irish immigrant Patrick Costello, who was expelled from the Parliament of Victoria in the 1860s for electoral fraud.

During the 1980s, Costello was a solicitor at the law firm Mallesons Stephen Jaques, then became a barrister and represented employers in some of Australia's best-known industrial relations disputes.

In 1982 Costello married Tanya (née Coleman), daughter of writer and former Liberal politician Peter Coleman.

In 1983 and 1984, Costello represented the National Farmers' Federation in legal action against the Australasian Meat Industry Employees Union (AMIEU). The AMIEU was seeking a unit tally system to be set up in abattoirs in the Northern Territory. The dispute focussed on one abattoir, Mudginberri, which chose to fight the AMIEU claim. Ultimately the AMIEU claim was unsuccessful.

Costello became counsel to organisations representing small business and rose to prominence in the 1985 Dollar Sweets case, as junior counsel assisting Alan Goldberg QC, successfully representing a confectionery company involved in a bitter industrial dispute.

Political background
In his student years, Costello was active in student politics. For a time, he was an office-bearer of the Social Democratic Students Association of Victoria, an affiliate of the Balaclava Branch of Australian Young Labor. In 1977, Costello was assaulted by a left-wing student politician, receiving mainstream media attention for the first time in his career as a result.

After graduating, Costello became more conservative but retained progressive views on some social issues. In 1984 he was a founding member of the H. R. Nicholls Society, a think tank on industrial relations. In the late 1980s, he was identified as part of the New Right movement, which was organised to some extent in the H. R. Nicholls Society.

Political career

Early political career

In 1990, Costello defeated sitting member Roger Shipton in a preselection ballot for the comfortably safe Liberal electorate of Higgins, the seat once held by Harold Holt and John Gorton.  He entered the House of Representatives at the age of 32. Costello made his maiden speech in May 1990 and mentioned "government should be subservient to the citizen; the Executive accountable to the representative parliament; and the monopoly give way in the face of the individual." 
Following the resignation of Andrew Peacock, Costello voted for John Hewson to replace Peacock as Liberal Leader and Costello was made shadow minister for Consumer affairs and later Shadow Attorney General. However Hewson despite launching Peter's local campaign in Higgins, despised Costello making it clear to him that he would not be appointed a Minister in a Hewson government and always maintained suspicion about Costello due to his admiration for John Howard.

On one occasion Hewson accused Costello of bad mouthing him to journalist Laurie Oakes which Costello denied.

Hewson's shock defeat at the 1993 election, Costello believes, can be attributed to Hewson lacking the experience to know which things to try to change and which things to avoid trying to change. Costello believed Hewson fought everyone from Churches and Welfare groups over the GST to the Supernnuation and Medicare organisations and recipients. Costello claimed he found it hard to promote the Liberal party's zero Tariff policy to the car industry.

Costello's profile became higher following the 1993 election becoming Shadow Finance Minister after his failure to become deputy leader. After the "sports rorts affair" with Sport Minister Ros Kelly: after revealing Kelly did not handle funding properly for the policy, Hewson and Costello demanded she resign, and she did, this and other factors made Costello be seen as alternative leader to Hewson. Hewson was deposed as Liberal leader in May 1994, Costello supported Alexander Downer for the leadership, becoming his Deputy Leader and shadow Treasurer. What may have prevented Costello from challenging Hewson for the leadership himself was that it would have proven correct an accusation by Victorian Liberal Premier Jeff Kennett that Costello and his friend, former Victorian Liberal party president Michael Kroger, had undermined Hewson's leadership prior to Hewson calling the leadership spill that partly occurred because of Costello in the first place.

However, Downer resigned in January 1995. Costello did not seek the leadership, instead supporting John Howard. It was revealed in July 2006 that this was due to a December 1994 meeting between Howard, Costello and Ian McLachlan during which Howard allegedly agreed to stand aside after one and a half terms as Prime Minister in return for Costello's agreement not to challenge for the leadership. Howard denied that this was a formal arrangement.

Hewson noted with irony in 2009 that Costello's best chances of becoming leader were at the 1994 leadership spill or when Downer stood down, several months later.

As Deputy Leader until 2007, he was the longest serving in that role, achieving that status in 2006 after breaking the record of the party's first Deputy Leader Sir Eric Harrison. He also spent all but the last two years of his career on the front bench.

Federal Treasurer (1996–2007)

The Liberal/National coalition headed by Howard won the 1996 election, defeating the Keating government on a 29-seat swing, and Costello became Federal Treasurer at age 38, the same age at which Howard himself had become treasurer in 1977. He oversaw the return to and maintenance of federal budget surpluses, which enabled significant reduction in government debt. Costello brought down twelve consecutive Federal Budgets, including ten surpluses. During this period he eliminated the Commonwealth Government net debt of $96 billion. He also sold 2/3rds of the Reserve Bank's substantial gold holdings at a record low price. Inflation, interest rates and unemployment all fell and remained generally low during Costello's term as Treasurer.

Tax reform became a major policy focus for Costello. Although John Howard had promised during the 1996 election campaign that he would "never, ever" introduce a GST, it returned as Liberal Party policy for the 1998 election. It was passed through the Senate with the help of the Australian Democrats. Until July 2005, Costello's own agenda of labour market deregulation remained blocked by the government's lack of a Senate majority.

In 1998, Costello and his wife Tanya, along with Tony Abbott and his wife Margaret, successfully sued author Bob Ellis for false statements he made about them in his book Goodbye Jerusalem.

Costello advocated for change to a republic at the Australian Constitutional Convention 1998. He rejected any suggestion that Australia was not already an independent nation and said that the Australian Constitution works "remarkably well". It was the institution of monarchy that was the crux of his argument for change:

Costello supported the 1999 referendum on whether Australia should become a republic.

After the 2001 election, he attracted criticism for not securing funding for a key election promise to extend the Medicare safety net. 

In 2002, The Baby bonus scheme was reintroduced by the Federal Government of Australia in the 2002 budget was aimed at offsetting the expenses associated with bearing a child. The scheme was also introduced as a means of increasing Australia's fertility rate and to mitigate the effects of Australia's ageing population. Costello famously had a slogan to encourage Australians to "have one for mum, one for dad and one for the country".  

In February 2006, Costello caused controversy during a lecture at the Sydney Institute when questioned about the government's refusal to legally recognise same-sex marriage. He stated, "I think we do recognise the rights of gay and lesbian people in Australia. We do not criminalise [their] conduct or behaviour." He also pointed out that the law was changed in 2004 to recognise same-sex couples with regards to superannuation. He stated that marriage should only be recognised between heterosexual couples. Also during the same speech, Costello criticised "mushy misguided multiculturalism," warning immigrants that the acceptance of Australian values was "not optional."

Leadership aspirations

Under Howard

Costello expected to gain the Liberal leadership some time during Howard's second term as Prime Minister, as per Howard's alleged December 1994 offer. When this did not eventuate, it is alleged that Costello became frustrated, particularly when Howard announced, in July 2003, his intention to lead the government into the 2004 election.

During the 2004 election campaign, Howard avoided saying whether he would serve a full term if re-elected, saying only he would remain as long as his party supported him. The government's subsequent success in winning control of the Senate raised further speculation that Howard would delay his retirement, and the prospect of a Costello leadership succession appeared to recede.

In July 2006, the alleged Costello/Howard succession deal was made public by Ian McLachlan. Costello confirmed the incident had occurred and that he shared McLachlan's interpretation of events. Howard denied the claims repeatedly, stating the continued public drama displayed "hubris and arrogance" and that the leadership was the party room's to decide, not a prize to be handed over by leaders to successors.

Press Gallery columnist Michelle Grattan described Costello's actions :

Despite tensions between the Prime Minister and the Treasurer, nothing further came of those events. Neither Howard nor Costello took any action to remove the other from office, or resign. However, on 12 September 2007, amid renewed leadership tensions and a series of unfavourable public polls, Howard confirmed he would step aside well into the next term, if re-elected, and that Costello would be his "logical successor".

A federal election was held on 24 November 2007. An exit poll of 2,787 voters by Auspoll, commissioned by Sky News, included a question on the statement "I don’t want Peter Costello to become Prime Minister". Fifty-nine per cent agreed, while 41 per cent disagreed. The Coalition lost the election.

In opposition (2007–2009)
Costello was widely expected to assume the Liberal leadership after the 2007 election, but the day after the election, in a surprise announcement, he said that he would not seek or accept the leadership or deputy leadership of the Liberal Party. This was after John Howard, in his concession speech on the night of the election, specifically endorsed Costello as the next leader for the Coalition. A week later, he indicated that he would be unlikely to serve out in full his parliamentary term of three years.

However, as opposition leader Brendan Nelson struggled, speculation mounted that Costello would change his mind and seek the leadership. In August 2008, he ruled out challenging Nelson, but did not comment on the prospect of Nelson stepping aside in his favour.

Finally in September 2008, just before the release of his memoirs, The Costello Memoirs, Costello specifically re-confirmed that he would not be seeking leadership of the party and would leave politics at a time that suited him. Media attention immediately shifted to whether Costello's decision cleared the way for a leadership challenge by Malcolm Turnbull (who was the shadow treasurer at the time). Tony Abbott described the decision as a great loss to Australia and to Costello himself, who might continue to have regrets for the rest of his life at what might have been. Media outlets capitalised on Costello's failure to categorically rule out any future leadership challenge. An incumbent-announced leadership spill on the morning of Costello's book release saw Turnbull defeat Nelson. Costello remained as an opposition backbencher. On 18 September 2008, Costello was appointed to the World Bank's new Independent Advisory Board, (IAB), which will provide advice on anti-corruption measures.

On 15 June 2009, Costello announced that he would retire from Parliament at the next Federal election. However on 7 October 2009, Costello announced he would be resigning from Parliament when it resumed later in the month. He resigned on 19 October 2009, triggering the 2009 Higgins by-election.  Costello's departure came just prior to the ETS crisis that lead to Malcolm Turnbull losing
the Liberal party leadership to Tony Abbott.

Post-political career
Costello is a member of the Board of Guardians of the Australian Government Future Fund since December 2009. Amidst some controversy it was announced that David Gonski would succeed the inaugural Chairman, David Murray when Murray's term expired on 3 April 2012. Gonski's appointment was in spite of an independent review (that was conducted by Gonski). Gonski reported to the Australian Government that the existing Guardians favoured Costello to succeed Murray as Chairman.

Costello is a managing partner of BKK Partners, a boutique corporate advisory run by former Goldman Sachs JBWere managers. He also chairs the advisory board of specialist corporate advisory firm ECG Advisory Solutions.

In 2008, his best-selling memoir was published by Melbourne University Press.

Costello writes a regular column for Fairfax newspapers.

In October 2010, Howard published a memoir, Lazarus Rising, that drew the ire of Costello and others. Howard used the memoir to settle some personal scores, calling Costello "an elitist, who's unable to connect to ordinary Australians" and accuses Costello of bungling the leadership handover issue. Costello responded by claiming that Howard "appears to be incapable of taking responsibility for the defeat of the government and for losing his seat of Bennelong."

In May 2012, Michael Kroger accused Costello of being interested in returning to Federal Parliament, most likely by getting a Liberal MP to step aside, with the hope of becoming leader of the Liberal Party. Costello denied this, saying that Kroger had approached him asking to help preserve his ex-wife Helen Kroger's Senate position. At around the same time, Helen Kroger was demoted on the Senate Liberal ticket for Victoria. Kroger believes Costello was targeting her along with others; Kroger also claimed Costello very often criticises past and present Liberal party MPs and officials.

In February 2016, Costello was appointed chairman of the Nine Entertainment Co.

Honours
On 26 January 2011, Peter Costello was appointed a Companion of the Order of Australia (AC) for "eminent service to the Parliament of Australia, particularly through the development of landmark economic policy reforms in the areas of taxation, foreign investment, superannuation and corporate regulation, and through representative roles with global financial organisations".

References

External links

Peter Costello – Official Website (www.petercostello.com.au)
Biography – Monash University prominent alumni profile

 

Treasurers of Australia
Members of the Cabinet of Australia
Australian Anglicans
Australian barristers
Australian economists
Australian investment bankers
Australian people of Irish descent
Australian republicans
Liberal Party of Australia members of the Parliament of Australia
Members of the Australian House of Representatives
Members of the Australian House of Representatives for Higgins
People educated at Carey Baptist Grammar School
Lawyers from Melbourne
Politicians from Melbourne
1957 births
Living people
Monash Law School alumni
Converts to Anglicanism from Baptist denominations
Companions of the Order of Australia
Delegates to the Australian Constitutional Convention 1998
20th-century Australian politicians
World Bank people
Nine Entertainment
21st-century Australian politicians
Government ministers of Australia
Australian officials of the United Nations